Mihai S. Radu (April 29, 1947 – March 25, 2009) was a Romanian American political scientist and journalist who grew up in Romania. He was Senior Fellow at the Foreign Policy Research Institute in Philadelphia, Pennsylvania and Co-Chairman of FPRI's Center on Terrorism, Counter-Terrorism, and Homeland Security.

Early life and education

Radu was born in Romania on April 29, 1947. Michael's mother had been born in Rockford, Illinois to Romanian immigrants. Radu was educated at the Babeș-Bolyai University in Cluj (1965–1975) before emigrating to the United States in 1976. He earned his PhD in international relations from Columbia University in 1992, focusing on Africa. He was a visiting senior lecturer on African politics at the University of the Witwatersrand in Johannesburg.

Career
Radu studied terrorist and insurgent groups worldwide from the mid-1980s until his death in 2009. He monitored the 1993 election in Cambodia, as well as elections in Romania, Peru, and Guatemala. He was a National Peace Fellow at the Hoover Institution on War, Revolution and Peace.

Radu was the author or editor of twelve books on international affairs and a member of the International Advisory Board of the Review of International Law and Politics.  His writings have appeared in The Wall Street Journal, The New York Times, Newsweek, and Associated Press. He has also contributed articles in the Romanian newspapers România Liberă and Cotidianul.

Michael Radu died on March 25, 2009, at the age of 61.

Selected publications

References

1947 births
2009 deaths
Babeș-Bolyai University alumni
Columbia University alumni
Geopoliticians
American Africanists
Romanian Africanists
American male journalists
20th-century American journalists
American political scientists
American political writers
Latin Americanists
Romanian emigrants to the United States
Academic staff of the University of the Witwatersrand
20th-century political scientists